, NAS for short, is a Japanese anime production and character merchandising company, a wholly owned subsidiary of the advertising agency Asatsu-DK. The "Ad" in its title is an abbreviation for "Animation Development". Along with animation studios Sunrise, Toei Animation and TMS Entertainment, it is co-founder and shareholder of the Japanese anime television network Animax. It has its headquarters in  Toranomon Hills, Minato, Tokyo.

List of productions

TV series
Chikkun Takkun
High School! Kimengumi
Tsuide ni Tonchinkan
Dragon Quest
Genji Tsūshin Agedama
Hime-chan's Ribbon
Akazukin Chacha
Captain Tsubasa J
Dino Adventure Jurassic Tripper
Ai Tenshi Densetsu Wedding Peach
Nurse Angel Ririka SOS
Neon Genesis Evangelion
Mizuiro Jidai
Kodomo no Omocha
Kero Kero Chime
Beast Wars II: Super Life-Form Transformers
Super Life-Form Transformers: Beast Wars Neo
Hatsumei Boy Kanipan
Cho Hatsumei Boy Kanipan
Maso Kishin Cybuster
Medarot
Bikkuriman 2000
Kyoro-chan
Transformers: Car Robots
Yu-Gi-Oh! Duel Monsters
Medarot Damashii
The Powerpuff Girls (TV Tokyo version)
Fruits Basket
Ask Dr. Rin!
Shaman King
Dennō Bōkenki Webdiver
The Prince of Tennis
Forza! Hidemaru
Bakuto Sengen Daigunder
Rockman.EXE
Full Moon o Sagashite
Bomberman Jetters
Shin Megami Tensei: D-Children - Light & Dark
Dragon Drive
Super Robot Life-Form Transformers: Legend of the Microns
Boken Yuki Pluster World
Tank Knights Portriss (co-production)
Transformers: Superlink
Sgt. Frog
Get Ride! Amdriver
Onmyō Taisenki
Kappa no Kaikata
Yu-Gi-Oh! Duel Monsters GX
Eyeshield 21
Twin Princess of Wonder Planet
Ginga Legend Weed
Kotencotenco
Humanoid Monster Bem
Twin Princess of Wonder Planet Gyu!
Kōtetsu Sangokushi
Kamichama Karin
Zombie-Loan
Dragonaut: The Resonance
Yu-Gi-Oh! 5D's
Vampire Knight
Natsume's Book of Friends
Natsume's Book of Friends Continued
Mainichi Kaasan
Pretty Rhythm: Aurora Dream
Yu-Gi-Oh! Zexal
Natsume's Book of Friends Three
Kimi to Boku.
New Prince of Tennis
Natsume's Book of Friends Four
Kuroko no Basuke
Sengoku Collection
Ginga e Kickoff!!
Chōyaku Hyakunin isshu: Uta Koi
My Little Monster
Yu-Gi-Oh! Zexal II
Day Break Illusion
Yu-Gi-Oh! Arc-V
Bakumatsu Rock
Akame ga Kill!
Gugure! Kokkuri-san
Sengoku Musou
Blood Blockade Battlefront
Rokka no Yuusha
Kamisama Minarai: Himitsu no Cocotama
Hacka Doll The Animation
Dance with Devils
Cheer Boys!!
Matoi the Sacred Slayer
Natsume's Book of Friends Five
Nanbaka
ACCA: 13-Territory Inspection Dept.
Anonymous Noise
Yu-Gi-Oh! VRAINS
Natsume's Book of Friends Six
Aho-Girl
Tsuredure Children
Ore-tacha Yokai Ningen
School Babysitters
Hinomaru Sumo
Magical Sempai
Are You Lost?
True Cooking Master Boy
In/Spectre

Films
Battle Fighters Garou Densetsu (TV film)
Kochira Katsushika-ku Kameari Kōen-mae Hashutsujo: The Movie
Kochira Katsushika-ku Kameari Kōen-mae Hashutsujo: The Movie 2: UFO Shūrai! Tornado Daisakusen!!
Yu-Gi-Oh! Duel Monsters: Pyramid of Light
Keroro Gunsō the Super Movie
Chō Gekijōban Keroro Gunsō 2: Shinkai no Princess de Arimasu!
Forest of Piano
Keroro Gunso the Super Movie 3: Keroro vs. Keroro Great Sky Duel
Yu-Gi-Oh! The Movie: Super Fusion! Bonds That Transcend Time
Yu-Gi-Oh!: The Dark Side of Dimensions
Wakaokami wa Shogakusei!

Web series
Penguin Musume
7 Seeds
Kengan Ashura

References

External links

Official site 
 

Animax
Anime companies
Advertising agencies of Japan
Mass media companies established in 1975
Japanese companies established in 1975
Mass media companies based in Tokyo